Janis Carol Amatuzio (born 1950) is an American forensic pathology specialist. She has authored books and has practiced forensic science for 20 years. Amatuzio is known as the "compassionate coroner".

Early life 
Amatuzio was born in Minnesota and is Italian American. Her father was Donald Amatuzio, a physician who died in 2006.

Career 
Amatuzio trained at the University of Minnesota and the Hennepin County Medical Center before founding Midwest Forensic Pathology in Minneapolis. She was the Medical Examiner in Anoka County and served as coroner in a number of counties in Minnesota and Wisconsin until 2009.

A protégée of Amatuzio, Dr. A. Quinn Strobl, performed the autopsy of the famous singer Prince in 2016.

Other work 
Amatuzio has appeared on the crime TV series Deadly Women and Forensic Files.

Personal life 
Amatuzio lives in Coon Rapids, Minnesota.

Books 
 Forever Ours: Real Stories of Immortality and Living from a Forensic Pathologist, 2007
 Beyond Knowing: Mysteries and Messages of Death and Life from a Forensic Pathologist, 2008

See also 
 List of Italian Americans
 List of people from Minnesota

References

Further reading 
 Dr. Janis Amatuzio’s First Encounter With Life After Death at WordPress

External links 
 Official website
 

1950 births
21st-century American women scientists
American forensic pathologists
American people of Italian descent
American writers
Living people
People from Anoka County, Minnesota
People from Coon Rapids, Minnesota
People from Hennepin County, Minnesota
Scientists from Minneapolis
University of Minnesota Medical School alumni